Studenec na Blokah is a small village east of Nova Vas in the Municipality of Bloke in the Inner Carniola region of Slovenia.

Name
The name of the settlement was changed from Studenec to Studenec na Blokah in 1953.

Church
The local church in the settlement is dedicated to Saint Peter and belongs to the Parish of Bloke.

References

External links

Studenec na Blokah on Geopedia

Populated places in the Municipality of Bloke